Dysidea is a genus of sponges belonging to the family Dysideidae.

The genus has cosmopolitan distribution.

Species:

Dysidea aedificanda 
Dysidea amblia 
Dysidea anceps 
Dysidea arenaria 
Dysidea avara 
Dysidea cachui 
Dysidea cacos 
Dysidea cana 
Dysidea chalinoides 
Dysidea chilensis 
Dysidea cinerea 
Dysidea clathrata 
Dysidea conica 
Dysidea corallina 
Dysidea crassa 
Dysidea cristagalli 
Dysidea dakini 
Dysidea dendyi 
Dysidea digitata 
Dysidea distans 
Dysidea dokdoensis 
Dysidea dubia 
Dysidea enormis 
Dysidea etherea
Dysidea etheria 
Dysidea fasciculata 
Dysidea flabellum 
Dysidea fragilis 
Dysidea frondosa 
Dysidea geomunensis 
Dysidea glavea 
Dysidea gracilis 
Dysidea granulosa 
Dysidea gumminea 
Dysidea hirciniformis 
Dysidea hirsuta 
Dysidea horrens 
Dysidea hydra 
Dysidea implexa 
Dysidea incrustans 
Dysidea incrustata 
Dysidea janiae 
Dysidea kenkriegeri 
Dysidea laxa 
Dysidea lehnerti 
Dysidea ligneana 
Dysidea marshalli 
Dysidea minna 
Dysidea mureungensis 
Dysidea navicularis 
Dysidea nigrescens 
Dysidea nivea 
Dysidea oculata 
Dysidea pallescens 
Dysidea perfistulata 
Dysidea ramoglomerata 
Dysidea ramosa
Dysidea ramsayi 
Dysidea reformensis 
Dysidea robusta 
Dysidea sabulum 
Dysidea sagum 
Dysidea septosa 
Dysidea spiculifera 
Dysidea spiculivora 
Dysidea spinosa 
Dysidea teawanui 
Dysidea tenuifibra 
Dysidea tuapokere 
Dysidea tubulata 
Dysidea tupha 
Dysidea tupha 
Dysidea uriae 
Dysidea variabilis 
Dysidea villosa 
Dysidea violata

References

Dictyoceratida
Sponge genera